Lucaina is a genus of net-winged beetles in the family Lycidae. There are at least 2 described species in Lucaina.

Species
 Lucaina discoidalis Horn, 1885
 Lucaina marginata Gorham, 1883

References

Further reading

 
 
 

Lycidae